S-Bahn Zentralschweiz (Central Swiss Suburban Railway) may refer to:
 Lucerne S-Bahn
 Zug Stadtbahn